This is a list of notable chicken restaurants. This list includes casual dining, fast casual and fast food restaurants which typically specialize in chicken dishes such as fried chicken, chicken and waffles, Chicken sandwiches or chicken and biscuits.

Chicken restaurants
 4 Fingers Crispy Chicken
 Albaik
 Anchor Bar
 Baes Fried Chicken, Portland, Oregon, USA
 Bonchon Chicken
 Buffalo Wild Wings
 Buffalo Wings and Rings
 Chicken and Guns, Portland, Oregon, USA
 Chicken in the Rough
 Chicken Salad Chick
 Chicken Shack
 Dell Rhea's Chicken Basket
 Duff's Famous Wings
 El Pollo Loco
 Golden Chick
 Grandy's
 Gus's World Famous Fried Chicken
 The Halal Guys
 Hattie B's Hot Chicken
 Harold's Chicken Shack
 Hen House
 Hooters
 Hot Chicken Takeover
 Mary Brown's, Canada
 Max's Restaurant
 Ma Yu Ching's Bucket Chicken House
 Nando's
 Pollo Campero
 Pollo Palenque
 Pollo Tropical
 Prince's Hot Chicken Shack
 Quaker Steak & Lube
 Roscoe's House of Chicken and Waffles
 Rostipollos
 Siipiweikot
 St-Hubert, Canada
 Scores
 Slim Chickens
 Smithfield's Chicken 'N Bar-B-Q
 Swiss Chalet, Canada
 Tip-Top Restaurant
 White Coffee Pot
 White Fence Farm
 Wild Wing Cafe
 Wingstop
 Zehnder's

Fast-food chicken restaurants

 Albaik
 Al Tazaj
 Bacolod Chicken Inasal
 Bojangles
 Boston Market
 Brown's Chicken & Pasta
 Bush's Chicken
 California Fried Chicken
 Chefette
 Chester's
 Chick-fil-A
 Chick'nCone
 Chicken Cottage
 Chicken Delight
 Chicken Express
 Chicken Licken
 Chicken Republic
 The Chicken Rice Shop
 Chicken Shack
 Chicken Treat
 ChicKing
 Chooks-to-Go
 Church's Chicken
 Cluck-U Chicken
 Dixie Lee Fried Chicken
 Dixy Chicken
 El Pollo Loco
 Ezell's Chicken
 Foosackly's
 Fosters Freeze
 Frisby
 Geprek Bensu
 Golden Chick
 Golden Skillet
 Guthrie's
 Harold's Chicken Shack
 Hartz Chicken
 HNT Chicken
 J&G Fried Chicken
 Jollibee
 Juan Pollo
 Kennedy Fried Chicken
 Kenny Rogers Roasters
 KFC
 KLG
 Krispy Krunchy Chicken
 Kudu
 Kyochon
 Lee's Famous Recipe Chicken
 Louisiana Fried Chicken
 Mang Inasal
 Marrybrown
 Martin's BBQ
 Mary Brown's
 Max's of Manila
 Morley's
 Mrs. Winner's Chicken & Biscuits
 Oporto
 Pelicana Chicken
 Pollo Brujo – ten locations in Guatemala; also in Colombia, Costa Rica and Mexico
 Pollo Campero – based in Guatemala
 Pollos Frisby
 Popeyes Louisiana Kitchen
 Pudgie's
 Raising Cane's Chicken Fingers
 Red Rooster
 Roy Rogers Restaurants
 SCR
 Slim Chickens
 Southern Fried Chicken
 Tastee Fried Chicken
 TKK Fried Chicken
 Wienerwald
 Wild Wing Restaurants
 Wing Zone
 WingStreet
 Wing Stop
 YaYa's Flame Broiled Chicken
 Zankou Chicken
 Zaxby's

Defunct chicken restaurants
 Chicken George
 Chooks Fresh & Tasty
 Coon Chicken Inn
 Koo Koo Roo
 Minnie Pearl's Fried Chicken
 Pioneer Chicken
 Sisters Chicken & Biscuits

See also

 Fried chicken restaurant
 Hofbrau
 List of chicken dishes
 List of fried chicken dishes
 List of fast food restaurant chains
 List of restaurant chains
 Lists of restaurants
 Los Pollos Hermanos, a fictional chicken restaurant
 National Fried Chicken Day
Chicken as food

References

Further reading

External links
 

Lists of restaurants